Kingdom of Siam may refer to:
 Sukhothai Kingdom (1238–1351) 
 Ayutthaya Kingdom (1351–1767)
 Thonburi Kingdom (1768–1782)
 Rattanakosin Kingdom (1782–1932)
 Thailand before 24 June 1939 and again from 8 September 1945 to 20 July 1949